Emerald Sun is a Greek power metal band from Thessaloniki formed in 1998.

Discography 
 High in the Sky (Demo, 1998)
 The Story Begins (Studio album, 2005)
 Escape from Twilight (Studio album, 2007)
 Regeneration (Studio album, 2011)
 Metal Dome (Studio album, 2015)
 Under the Curse of Silence (Studio album, 2018)
 Kingdom of Gods (Studio album, 2022)

External links 
 Official website
 Emerald Sun at Facebook

Greek power metal musical groups
Musical groups established in 1998